Nicolae Ghiţă (born 16 November 1967) is a Romanian former wrestler who competed in the 1992 Summer Olympics, in the 1996 Summer Olympics, in the 2000 Summer Olympics, and in the 2004 Summer Olympics.

References

External links
 

1967 births
Living people
Olympic wrestlers of Romania
Wrestlers at the 1992 Summer Olympics
Wrestlers at the 1996 Summer Olympics
Wrestlers at the 2000 Summer Olympics
Romanian male sport wrestlers
Wrestlers at the 2004 Summer Olympics